Koffi Gbondjidè Gervais DJONDO (born  1934) is a Togolese entrepreneur. He is the co-founder and former chairman of Ecobank. He is also the founder and current president of ASKY Airlines

Awards 
 Africa Awards for Entrepreneurship’s Lifetime Achievement Award (2014)

References 

Living people
1934 births